James Frank Bateman (6 June 1924 – 5 August 1991) was an Australian rules footballer in the Victorian Football League (VFL).

Personal life
Bateman served as a private in the Australian Army during the Second World War.

References

External links

Frank Bateman's playing statistics from The VFA Project
Blueseum: Frank Bateman profile

Carlton Football Club players
Preston Football Club (VFA) players
Leongatha Football Club players
Australian rules footballers from Victoria (Australia)
1924 births
1991 deaths
Australian Army personnel of World War II
Australian Army soldiers